100 Days (Chinese: 真愛100天) is a 2013 Taiwanese romantic comedy film directed by Henry Chan, marking his second film since Gas.

Plot 

The main character is career-obsessed Bo Dan Wu (played by Johnny Lu), a rising star at a telecom company in Taipei. When he learns the news of his estranged mother's death, he reluctantly returns to his hometown (set in Matsu's picturesque Qinbi Village (芹壁村) to pay his respects. When he arrives, he learns of a tradition which requires him to either marry within 100 days or wait for three years.

There is just one catch: Bo Dan does not plan on getting married any time soon. Fortunately, his step-brother Zhen Fong (played by Soda Voyu), decides to marry his long-time fiancé Xiao Wei (played by Tracy Chou) in three days. It turns out that Xiao Wei is actually Bo Dan's childhood sweetheart, and when a typhoon prevents him from leaving the island, the two are forced with the possibility of rekindling their romance. Xiao Wei is forced to choose: her doting fiancé who is the “right” choice, or the man of her dreams.

Cast 
 Johnny Lu as Bo Dan Wu 
 Akira Chen (陳文彬) as Mo Shu
 Tracy Chou (周采詩) as Xiao Wei
 Julianne Chu (朱蕾安)
 Tsai Ming-hsiu (蔡明修) as Liu Ching
 Soda Voyu (蘇達) as Zhen Fong

Production 
Principal photography of the island scenes in the film were shot in Taiwan's Matsu Islands. Director Chan said he shot the film in Qinbi (芹壁村) Village on Matsu's Beigan Township  (北竿) island because the village looked like “it hasn’t been touched by time.”
“I wanted the village to be a character. If I came back to discover my own village and fell in love with it, it had to be attractive and beautiful,” Chan says.
But Matsu was an expensive choice. Lacking the infrastructure necessary for filmmaking, the crew had to ship everything to the island, including 14 trucks, cranes, generators and extras. And similar to the protagonist in the movie, a typhoon stranded the production team on the island a few times.
Additional scenes were shot in Taipei, Taiwan.

Release 

The film premiered at the 33rd Hawaii International Film Festival on October 13, 2013 with English subtitles.  Following this, the film saw a nationwide release in Taiwan on November 1, 2013.

References

External links 

 
 Official Website - Facebook

Chinese-language films
2010s Mandarin-language films
Taiwanese romantic comedy films
2013 films